Ladislav Belovič is a Slovak sprint canoer who competed in the early 2000s. He won a gold medal in the K-4 200 m event at the 2002 ICF Canoe Sprint World Championships in Seville.

References

Living people
Slovak male canoeists
Year of birth missing (living people)
ICF Canoe Sprint World Championships medalists in kayak